John Wesley Woodward (11 September 1879 – 15 April 1912) was an English musician. Born in West Bromwich on 11 September 1879, he was the youngest of ten children born to parents Joseph and Martha Woodward.

Known to all as Wesley, he became a professional musician, playing in Oxford, and Eastbourne. In Eastbourne he played the cello both at the Grand Hotel and in the local orchestra. While in Eastbourne he joined the White Star Line musicians, playing on transatlantic ships.

Five days later, on 15 April 1912, the ship hit an iceberg and he and the other musicians famously continued to play as the Titanic sank. Their final tune was, according to some survivor accounts, "Nearer My God To Thee". All members of the band, including his friend Jock Hume, drowned and the body of Wesley Woodward was never recovered.

A memorial plaque was erected to Woodward on the promenade in Eastbourne depicting the Titanic as it sank.

See also
 Musicians of the RMS Titanic

References

1879 births
1912 deaths
People from West Bromwich
English cellists
Deaths on the RMS Titanic
20th-century English male musicians
20th-century cellists